Hidden in the Fog (Swedish: I dimma dold) is a 1953 Swedish mystery crime film directed by Lars-Eric Kjellgren and starring Eva Henning, Sonja Wigert and Hjördis Petterson. It was shot at the Råsunda Studios in Stockholm and on location around the city. The film's sets were designed by the art director P.A. Lundgren. It was based on the 1951 novel of the same title by Vic Sunesson, who also contributed to the screenplay.

Synopsis
When her husband is found dead at their home, his wife becomes the prime suspect for his murder.

Cast
 Eva Henning as Lora Willding
 Sonja Wigert as 	Jimmie Hedström - Femme Fatale
 Hjördis Petterson as Annie Eriksson
 Dagmar Ebbesen as 	Vilma
 Sif Ruud as 	Bojan of Stureplan
 Mimi Nelson as 	Salvation Army Soldier
 Sven Lindberg as Police Inspector Kjell Myrman
 Sture Lagerwall as Jack Willding
 Georg Rydeberg as 	Walter Willding
 Hugo Björne as 	Fredrik Sjövall
 Erik Strandmark as 	Olle Lindaeus
 Erik 'Bullen' Berglund as 	Chief Superintendent 
 Torsten Hillberg as 	Policeman
 Henrik Schildt as 	Journalist
 Bengt Blomgren as 	Journalist
 Carl Andersson as 	Guest at the Wedding 
 Fritiof Billquist as 	Man Reading the Newspaper 
 Frithiof Bjärne as 	Policeman on the Phone 
 Brita Borg as 	Singer 
 Mats Dahlbäck as Young Man on the Tram 
 Sture Djerf as Journalist 
 Curt Ericson as 	Criminal Detective 
 Claes Esphagen as 	Wardrober at Restaurant Cecil 
 Fritjof Hellberg as 	Man 
 Svea Holm as 	Waitress 
 Åke Hylén as Press Photographer 
 Marianne Ljunggren as Miss China 
 Arne Ragneborn as 	Finnish Housemaid's Boyfriend 
 Magdalena Swahn as 	Annie's Finnish Housemaid 
 Putte Wickman as 	Member of the Orchestra 
 Gudrun Östbye as 	Young Girl in Love on the Tram

References

Bibliography 
 Brunsdale, Mitzi M. Encyclopedia of Nordic Crime Fiction: Works and Authors of Denmark, Finland, Iceland, Norway and Sweden Since 1967. McFarland, 2016.
 Qvist, Per Olov & von Bagh, Peter. Guide to the Cinema of Sweden and Finland. Greenwood Publishing Group, 2000.

External links 
 

1953 films
Swedish crime films
1953 crime films
Swedish mystery films
1950s mystery films
1950s Swedish-language films
Films directed by Lars-Magnus Lindgren
Films based on Swedish novels
Films set in Stockholm
Films shot in Stockholm
1950s Swedish films